Oui Entertainment is a South Korean entertainment agency founded in 2017 by Wee Myung-hee. The label is home to artists such as its artists include WEi, Kim Dong-han, Jang Dae-hyeon and Kim Yo-han, and also manages actors Kim I-on and Kim So-won.

History

Founder Wee Myeong-hee has built a career in management and production in Shinchon Music, Pan Entertainment, and GnG Production, and served as a director of the Korean Entertainment Producers Association. After working at Pan Entertainment, she used her family name to create an agency with a name similar to it to produce Park Seon-ju's 4th album. As she moved to GnG Production as a producer, the operation was suspended for a while and then resumed operation in 2017.

On April 7, 2017, Kim Dong-han and Jang Dae-hyeon participated in the Mnet's survival variety show Produce 101 season 2, in which they ranked in the 29th and 83rd place. After the show, they respectively debuted in JBJ and RAINZ. After the disbandment of both groups, they started their solo careers.

On November 3, 2018, trainees Yoo Yong-ha and Kim Jun-seo took part in MBC TV's variety show Under Nineteen, through which they ended up being in the final lineup and they officially debuted in 1THE9 on April 13, 2019, After 17 months of activities, they disbanded in August 2020.

From May to July 2019, Kim Yo-han participated in the Mnet's survival variety show Produce X 101 and finished in first place. He made his official debut in X1 on August 27. The group was supposed to last for 5 years, but they disbanded on January 6, 2020 due to the Mnet voting manipulation scandal. He officially started his solo career on August 25, 2020. 

In May 2020, Oui announced their first new boy group under the temporary name OUIBOYS. The group's name was later announced to be WEi and they debuted in October 2020.

In the end of 2021, it was announced that Oui will be managing the band CraXilver, which debuted in June 2022.

Artists

Recording artists

Groups
WEi
CraXilver

Soloists
Kim Dong-han
Jang Dae-hyeon
Kim Yo-han

Actors/actresses
Choi Seung-hoon
Kim Dong-han
Kim I-on
Kim So-won
Kim Yo-han

Former artists
Jo Sung-wook (2017–2021)
Seol In-ah (?–2022)

Discography

References

External links
 

Companies based in Seoul
K-pop record labels
South Korean record labels
Talent agencies of South Korea
Entertainment companies established in 2017
Record labels established in 2017